Byzantium or Byzantion was an ancient Greek city in classical antiquity that became known as Constantinople in late antiquity and Istanbul today. The Greek name Byzantion and its Latinization Byzantium continued to be used as a name of Constantinople sporadically and to varying degrees during the thousand year existence of the Byzantine Empire. Byzantium was colonized by Greeks from Megara in the 7th century BC and remained primarily Greek-speaking until its conquest by the Ottoman Empire in AD 1453.

Etymology

The etymology of Byzantium is unknown. It has been suggested that the name is of Thracian origin. It may be derived from the Thracian personal name Byzas which means "he-goat". Ancient Greek legend refers to the Greek king Byzas, the leader of the Megarian colonists and founder of the city. The name Lygos for the city, which likely corresponds to an earlier Thracian settlement, is mentioned by Pliny the Elder in his Natural History.

Byzántios, plural Byzántioi (adjective the same) referred to Byzantion's inhabitants, also used as an ethnonym for the people of the city and as a family name. In the Middle Ages, Byzántion was also a synecdoche for the eastern Roman Empire. (An ellipsis of ). Byzantinós denoted an inhabitant of the empire. The Anglicization of Latin Byzantinus yielded "Byzantine", with 15th and 16th century forms including Byzantin, Bizantin(e), Bezantin(e), and Bysantin as well as Byzantian and Bizantian.

The name Byzantius and Byzantinus were applied from the 9th century to gold Byzantine coinage, reflected in the French besant (d'or), Italian bisante, and English besant, byzant, or bezant. The English usage, derived from Old French besan (pl. besanz), and relating to the coin, dates from the 12th century.

Later, the name Byzantium became common in the West to refer to the Eastern Roman Empire, whose capital was Constantinople. As a term for the east Roman state as a whole, Byzantium was introduced by the historian Hieronymus Wolf only in 1555, a century after the last remnants of the empire, whose inhabitants continued to refer to their polity as the Roman Empire, had ceased to exist.

Other places were historically known as Byzántion (Βυζάντιον) – a city in Libya mentioned by Stephanus of Byzantium and another on the western coast of India referred to by the Periplus of the Erythraean Sea; in both cases the names were probably adaptations of names in local languages. Faustus of Byzantium was from a city of that name in Cilicia.

History

The origins of Byzantium are shrouded in legend. Tradition says that Byzas of Megara (a city-state near Athens) founded the city when he sailed northeast across the Aegean Sea. The date is usually given as 667 BC on the authority of Herodotus, who states the city was founded 17 years after Chalcedon. Eusebius, who wrote almost 800 years later, dates the founding of Chalcedon to 685/4 BC, but he also dates the founding of Byzantium to 656 BC (or a few years earlier depending on the edition). Herodotus' dating was later favored by Constantine the Great, who celebrated Byzantium's 1000th anniversary between the years 333 and 334.   

Byzantium was mainly a trading city due to its location at the Black Sea's only entrance. Byzantium later conquered Chalcedon, across the Bosphorus on the Asiatic side.

The city was taken by the Persian Empire at the time of the Scythian campaign (513 BC) of King Darius I (r. 522–486 BC), and was added to the administrative province of Skudra. Though Achaemenid control of the city was never as stable as compared to other cities in Thrace, it was considered, alongside Sestos, to be one of the foremost Achaemenid ports on the European coast of the Bosphorus and the Hellespont.

Byzantium was besieged by Greek forces during the Peloponnesian War. As part of Sparta's strategy for cutting off grain supplies to Athens during their siege of Athens, Sparta took control of the city in 411 BC, to bring the Athenians into submission. The Athenian military later retook the city in 408 BC, when the Spartans had withdrawn following their settlement.

After siding with Pescennius Niger against the victorious Septimius Severus, the city was besieged by Roman forces and suffered extensive damage in AD 196. Byzantium was rebuilt by Septimius Severus, now emperor, and quickly regained its previous prosperity. It was bound to Perinthus during the period of Septimius Severus. The strategic and highly defensible (due to being surrounded by water on almost all sides) location of Byzantium attracted Roman Emperor Constantine I who, in AD 330, refounded it as an imperial residence inspired by Rome itself, known as Nova Roma. Later the city was called Constantinople (Greek Κωνσταντινούπολις, Konstantinoupolis, "city of Constantine").

This combination of imperialism and location would affect Constantinople's role as the nexus between the continents of Europe and Asia. It was a commercial, cultural, and diplomatic centre and for centuries formed the capital of the Byzantine Empire, which decorated the city with numerous monuments, some still standing today. With its strategic position, Constantinople controlled the major trade routes between Asia and Europe, as well as the passage from the Mediterranean Sea to the Black Sea. On May 29, 1453, the city was conquered by the Ottoman Turks, and again became the capital of a powerful state, the Ottoman Empire. The Turks called the city "Istanbul" (although it was not officially renamed until 1930); the name derives from the Greek phrase "στην πόλη", which means "to the city". To this day it remains the largest and most populous city in Turkey, although Ankara is now the national capital.

Emblem 

By the late Hellenistic or early Roman period (1st century BC), the star and crescent motif was associated to some degree with Byzantium; even though it became more widely used as the royal emblem of Mithradates VI Eupator (who for a time incorporated the city into his empire).

Some Byzantine coins of the 1st century BC and later show the head of Artemis with bow and quiver, and feature a crescent with what appears to be an eight-rayed star on the reverse. 
According to accounts which vary in some of the details, in 340 BC the Byzantines and their allies the Athenians were under siege by the troops of Philip of Macedon. On a particularly dark and wet night Philip attempted a surprise attack but was thwarted by the appearance of a bright light in the sky. This light is occasionally described by subsequent interpreters as a meteor, sometimes as the moon, and some accounts also mention the barking of dogs. However, the original accounts mention only a bright light in the sky, without specifying the moon. To commemorate the event the Byzantines erected a statue of Hecate lampadephoros (light-bearer or bringer). This story survived in the works of Hesychius of Miletus, who in all probability lived in the time of Justinian I. His works survive only in fragments preserved in Photius and the tenth century lexicographer Suidas. The tale is also related by Stephanus of Byzantium, and Eustathius.

Devotion to Hecate was especially favored by the Byzantines for her aid in having protected them from the incursions of Philip of Macedon. Her symbols were the crescent and star, and the walls of her city were her provenance.

It is unclear precisely how the symbol Hecate/Artemis, one of many goddesses would have been transferred to the city itself, but it seems likely to have been an effect of being credited with the intervention against Philip and the subsequent honors. This was a common process in ancient Greece, as in Athens where the city was named after Athena in honor of such an intervention in time of war.

Cities in the Roman Empire often continued to issue their own coinage. "Of the many themes that were used on local coinage, celestial and astral symbols often appeared, mostly stars or crescent moons." The wide variety of these issues, and the varying explanations for the significance of the star and crescent on Roman coinage precludes their discussion here. It is, however, apparent that by the time of the Romans, coins featuring a star or crescent in some combination were not at all rare.

People
Homerus, tragedian, lived in the early 3rd century BC
Philo, engineer, lived c. 280 BC–c. 220 BC
Epigenes of Byzantium, astrologer, lived in the 3rd–2nd century BC
Aristophanes of Byzantium, a scholar who flourished in Alexandria, 3rd–2nd century BC
Myro, a Hellenistic female poet

See also
 Constantinople, which details the history of the city before 1453
Fall of Constantinople (1453)
 Istanbul, which details the history of the city from 1453 on, and describes the modern city
 Sarayburnu, which is the geographic location of ancient Byzantium
 Timeline of Istanbul history

Notes

References

Sources

 
 Harris, Jonathan, Constantinople: Capital of Byzantium (Hambledon/Continuum, London, 2007). 
Jeffreys, Elizabeth and Michael, and Moffatt, Ann, Byzantine Papers: Proceedings of the First Australian Byzantine Studies Conference, Canberra, 17–19 May 1978 (Australian National University, Canberra, 1979).
 Istanbul Historical Information – Istanbul Informative Guide To The City.  Retrieved January 6, 2005.
 The Useful Information about Istanbul . Retrieved January 6, 2005.
 The Oxford Dictionary of Byzantium (Oxford University Press, 1991) 
Yeats, William Butler, "Sailing to Byzantium",

External links
 Byzantine & Christian Museum at byzantinemuseum.gr
 Coins of the Byzantine empire at wegm.com
 History of money FAQs at galmarley.com – description of Byzantine monetary system, fifth century BC
 Society for the Promotion of Byzantine Studies at www.byzantium.ac.uk 
 Vasilief, A History of the Byzantine Empire, at ellopos.net – hyperlinked with notes and more resources, at Elpenor

Megarian colonies in Thrace
Ancient Greek archaeological sites in Turkey
667 BC
Populated places established in the 7th century BC
 
7th-century BC establishments
Members of the Delian League
Achaemenid ports
Greek city-states